Adele Reinhartz  (born 1953) is a Canadian academic and a specialist in the history and literature of Christianity and Judaism in the Greco-Roman period, the Gospel of John, early Jewish–Christian relations, literary criticism including feminist literary criticism, feminist exegesis, and the impact of the Bible on popular cinema and television.

Education
In 1975 Reinhartz received her Bachelor of Arts degree in religious studies from the University of Toronto, in 1977 her Master of Arts degree, and in 1983 her Doctor of Philosophy degree in religious studies from McMaster University.

Work
Reinhartz joined the McMaster faculty in 1987. She was dean of graduate studies and research at Wilfrid Laurier University before being appointed associate vice-president, research, at University of Ottawa in 2005.

In 1997–1998 she was the Canadian Society of Biblical Studies president, and in 2005 she was made a fellow of the Royal Society of Canada.

Reinhartz is the editor of the Journal of Biblical Literature.

Books
1992 The Word in the World: The Cosmological Tale in the Fourth Gospel
1998 Why Ask My Name? Anonymity and Identity in Biblical Narrative
2001 Befriending the Beloved Disciple: A Jewish Reading of the Gospel of John, winner the 2003 F. W. Beare Award for Outstanding Book in Christian Origins, Canadian Society of Biblical Studies
2002 Jesus, Judaism, and Christian Anti-Judaism: Reading the New Testament After the Holocaust. Editor with Paula Fredriksen.
2003 Scripture on the Silver Screen, a study of contemporary films that make use of the Bible,
2007 Jesus of Hollywood, about films featuring Jesus
2011 Caiaphas the High Priest (Studies on Personalities of the New Testament)

References

External links

1953 births
20th-century Canadian non-fiction writers
20th-century Canadian women writers
20th-century Jewish biblical scholars
21st-century Canadian non-fiction writers
21st-century Canadian women writers
21st-century Jewish biblical scholars
Academic journal editors
Canadian literary critics
Women literary critics
Canadian religion academics
Canadian university and college faculty deans
Canadian women non-fiction writers
Fellows of the Royal Society of Canada
Female biblical scholars
Feminist biblical scholars
Jewish Canadian writers
Jewish feminists
Living people
McMaster University alumni
Academic staff of McMaster University
University of Toronto alumni
Women deans (academic)
Canadian biblical scholars